Condor is a fictional character appearing in American comic books published by Marvel Comics.

Publication history
The Condor first appeared in Nova #2-3 (Oct.–Nov. 1976), and was created by Marv Wolfman and John Buscema. The character subsequently appears in Nova #6-8 (Feb.–April 1977), #10 (June 1977), Nova #2-5 (Feb.–May 1994), #13 (Jan. 1995), Nova #3-4 (July–Aug. 1999), #7 (Nov. 1999), and The Amazing Spider-Man #562-563 (Aug. 2008).

Fictional character biography
Condor is a winged criminal scientist and is a member of the Bird-People, an offshoot of the Inhumans that adopted Red Raven. He was a member of the Terrible Trio, along with Diamondhead and Powerhouse, and an enemy of Nova and the Champions of Xandar. During a battle with the Sphinx, he was transformed into an actual condor.

Condor spent several years in the form of an animal until he landed on the island of Bird-Brain and the Ani-Mates. Bird-Brain recognized that the Condor was not a real animal and transformed him into a semi-humanoid. He confronted Nova again angrily and ultimately left feeling their conflict had been useless.

Condor later attacked Nova and Reed Richards, but was defeated and taken into S.H.I.E.L.D. custody. Red Raven took this opportunity to attempt to bring the Condor back by force, hoping to place him on trial among the Bird-People to face justice. Red Raven led a group of Avians to assault Manhattan, but Nova managed to convince him to call off the attack.

The Condor appeared in Brand New Day as one of the villains in the bar.

It is revealed in the Guardians of the Galaxy series that Condor is one of the inmates left behind in the Negative Zone 42 prison. He, Bison, and Gorilla-Man II are involved in a fight with Star-Lord who, with the help of Jack Flag, is trying to stop Blastaar and his horde from invading Earth via the closed portal in the prison.

During the Avengers: Standoff! storyline, Condor was an inmate of Pleasant Hill, a gated community established by S.H.I.E.L.D. After his memory was restored by Baron Helmut Zemo and Fixer, he joined the villains on a rampage against S.H.I.E.L.D. and fought the Avengers.

Powers and abilities
The Condor possesses two wings on his back which allow for flight. He also has enhanced superhuman strength and sharp talons on the end of each finger.

Other characters named Condor
There had been other characters that used the name Condor:

 A character named Condor was Delvadian revolutionary where his men targeted US Ambassador Jerome Villers only for them to encounter Daredevil. After a wounded Villers was captured by Condor's men posing as EMTs, US Representative Keith Bayard tried to round up a posse to fight Condor's men only for them to end up defeated and Bayard to be captured. Daredevil overhears that Bayard is more useful to them while alive. Daredevil overhears Condor's plans to use the helicopters as weapons so that he can free the oppressors of his people. After freeing Bayard, Daredevil follows Condor onto his helicopter. During the fight, Condor leapt off the helicopter as he continues his battle with Daredevil on the ground. With their fight escalating near the statue of Condor, a bolt of lightning strikes the mountain as a landslide ends up crushing Condor while Daredevil gets away from the landslide.
 A superhero called El Condor was among the South American superheroes that were killed by Everyman (who operated under the alias of Zeitgeist).
 A character Condor is a member of the Contingency, a former S.H.I.E.L.D. Black Ops team that was created to kill mutants.

References

External links
 Condor (Bird People) at Marvel Wiki
 Condor (Daredevil villain) at Marvel Wiki
 El Condor at Marvel Wiki
 Condor (Contingency member) at Marvel Wiki
 

Characters created by John Buscema
Characters created by Marv Wolfman
Comics characters introduced in 1976
Marvel Comics characters with superhuman strength
Marvel Comics male supervillains
Marvel Comics scientists
Marvel Comics supervillains